Springdale Township is one of seventeen townships in Cedar County, Iowa, USA.  As of the 2000 census, its population was 2,857.

History
Springdale Township was established in 1853. Springdale Township was an important point on the Underground Railroad.

Geography
According to the USGS, it contains six cemeteries: Chamness, Downey, Hickory Grove, Old Friends, Springdale and West Branch. The unincorporated community of Springdale was historically important in the anti-slavery movement.

References

External links

 US-Counties.com
 City-Data.com

Townships in Cedar County, Iowa
Townships in Iowa
1853 establishments in Iowa